Emilian of Faenza, Irish pilgrim and bishop, fl. 7th or 8th century.

Biography

Emilian was an Irish bishop who died in Faenza, Italy, sometime in the 7th or 8th century. He was buried in the church of St. Clement in the town, his body been rediscovered in the 10th century, which led to its removal to what is now the parish church of St Emilian.

He is attributed with miracles banishing demonic possession, which led to a cult in his name, attested in 1139.  He is commemorated on Nov. 6.

See also

 Catald
 Fulco of Ireland
 Myles Keogh
 James Joyce

References

 Irish "Peregrini" in Tuscany/Umbria/Lombardy, Professor Noel Mulcahy, in North Munster Antiquarian Journal (2005?), p. 134.

7th-century Irish bishops
8th-century Irish bishops
Irish expatriates in Italy